Paul Angelo Blanchette (born April 16, 1994) is an American soccer player who currently plays for Oakland Roots SC in the USL Championship.

Career

College 
Blanchette played four years of college soccer at Loyola Marymount University between 2012 and 2015.

Semi-professional
While at college, Blanchette appeared for USL PDL sides Portland Timbers U23s and Des Moines Menace.

Following college, Blanchette continued in the PDL with Burlingame Dragons for their 2016 season, before transferring to Finnish Kakkonen side PEPO Lappeenranta in January 2017.

In 2018, Blanchette returned to the PDL again, playing with Santa Cruz Breakers.

Blanchette spent 2019 with NPSL side New York Cosmos.

Professional 
On March 7, 2020, Blanchette signed for USL Championship side Rio Grande Valley FC. He made his debut the following day, starting in a 1–5 loss to LA Galaxy II. RGVFC opted to decline their contact option on Blanchette following the 2020 season.

On July 6, 2021, Blanchette joined Oakland Roots SC.

References

External links 
 Paul Blanchette - Men's Soccer LMU bio

1994 births
Living people
American soccer players
Association football goalkeepers
Loyola Marymount Lions men's soccer players
Portland Timbers U23s players
Des Moines Menace players
Burlingame Dragons FC players
New York Cosmos (2010) players
Rio Grande Valley FC Toros players
Soccer players from California
National Premier Soccer League players
USL Championship players
USL League Two players
Kakkonen players
American expatriate soccer players
American expatriate sportspeople in Finland
Expatriate footballers in Finland
PEPO Lappeenranta players
De Anza Force players